Swift of Ipswich is a topsail schooner owned and operated by the Los Angeles Maritime Institute's TopSail Youth Program as a sail training vessel for at-risk youth.

History

Originally built in Ipswich, Massachusetts as a private yacht, Swift of Ipswich is a reduced-scale replica of Swift, an American privateer from the Revolutionary War which was captured by the Royal Navy, transported to Britain, and deconstructed.  The drawings produced from the original Swift have been used as the basis for several tall ship designs, mostly due to their completeness in an era which produced few detailed drawings (most ship designs having been scale models which have not survived intact).  Soon after completion, Swift of Ipswich was sold to actor James Cagney and transported to Newport Beach, where she served as his private yacht and appeared in numerous Hollywood films.

After being sold by Cagney in 1958, the Swift was used for various purposes, such as harbor tours, before being acquired by the Los Angeles Maritime Institute in 1991.

Swift of Ipswich participated in the Clash of the Tall Ships II in Long Beach Harbor in January, 1998.

Reconstruction

After the delivery of the twin brigantines Irving Johnson and Exy Johnson, Swift went into semi-retirement while fundraising proceeded to begin an extensive rebuilding, necessary after over 65 years of wear, tear, and exposure to salt water.  Currently, work has begun on the reconstruction, although no firm completion date has been given.

References

External links
The Swift of Ipswich
TopSail Youth Program
The Los Angeles Maritime Institute
The Los Angeles Maritime Museum
Tall Ships America

Museum ships in California
Sail training ships
Tall ships of the United States
Schooners of the United States
Training ships of the United States
Replica ships
Ships built in Ipswich, Massachusetts
1939 ships